Pentila is a genus of butterflies, commonly called pentilas or buffs, in the family Lycaenidae. The species of this genus are endemic to the Afrotropics. For other butterflies called buffs, see genus Baliochila.

Species
Listed alphabetically:
Pentila abraxas Westwood, 1852
Pentila alba Dewitz, 1886
Pentila amenaida Hewitson, 1873
Pentila amenaidoides (Holland, 1893)
Pentila auga Karsch, 1895
Pentila bennetti Collins & Larsen, 2003
Pentila bitje Druce, 1910
Pentila camerunica Stempffer & Bennett, 1961
Pentila carcassoni Stempffer & Bennett, 1961
Pentila christina Suffert, 1904
Pentila cloetensi Aurivillius, 1898
Pentila condamini Stempffer, 1963
Pentila fallax Bethune-Baker, 1915
Pentila fidonioides Schultze, 1923
Pentila glagoessa (Holland, 1893)
Pentila hewitsoni (Grose-Smith & Kirby, 1887)
Pentila inconspicua Druce, 1910 – inconspicuous pentila
Pentila landbecki Stempffer & Bennett, 1961
Pentila maculata (Kirby, 1887)
Pentila mesia Hulstaert, 1924
Pentila nero (Grose-Smith & Kirby, 1894)
Pentila nigeriana Stempffer & Bennett, 1961
Pentila occidentalium Aurivillius, 1899
Pentila pauli Staudinger, 1888 – Paul's buff
Pentila petreia Hewitson, 1874
Pentila petreoides Bethune-Baker, 1915
Pentila phidia Hewitson, 1874
Pentila picena Hewitson, 1874
Pentila preussi Staudinger, 1888
Pentila pseudorotha Stempffer & Bennett, 1961
Pentila rogersi (Druce, 1907) – Rogers' pentila
Pentila rondo Kielland, 1990
Pentila rotha Hewitson, 1873
Pentila subfuscata Hawker-Smith, 1933
Pentila swynnertoni Stevenson, 1940
Pentila tachyroides Dewitz, 1879 – mylothrid pentila
Pentila torrida (Kirby, 1887)
Pentila tropicalis (Boisduval, 1847) – tropical pentila, spotted buff
Pentila umangiana Aurivillius, 1898
Pentila umbra Holland, 1892

References

Seitz, A. Die Gross-Schmetterlinge der Erde 13: Die Afrikanischen Tagfalter. Plate XIII 63 and 64

Poritiinae
Taxa named by John O. Westwood
Lycaenidae genera